The Word On The Street is a Canadian book and magazine festival held each September in Toronto, Kitchener, Lethbridge, Saskatoon, and Halifax.

Each city's festival features author readings, workshops, information booths, marketplace, and reading- and writing-related activities. The mandate of the organization is "to unite the country in a national, annual celebration of reading and writing and to highlight the importance of literacy in the lives of all Canadians."

Over the years, The Word On The Street has attracted numerous famous Canadian authors for author readings, such as Margaret Atwood, Pierre Berton, Arthur Black, Joy Fielding, Timothy Findley, Dennis Lee, Robert Munsch, Paul Quarrington, Michael Redhill, and David Suzuki, to name just a few.

In September 2012, the six single-day regional events welcomed more than 250,000 visitors and offered more than 400 programmed events featuring 585 authors, workshop presenters, and arts performers. The festival also showcased more than 500 book and magazine exhibitors promoting mostly Canadian works.

Founding organizations 
Founding organizations include:

 Book and Periodical Council
 Canadian Give The Gift of Literacy Foundation
 Canadian Authors Association
 Canadian Book Information Centre
 Canadian Book Publishers Council
 Canadian Booksellers Associations
 Canadian Children’s Book Centre
 Freelance Editors Association of Canada
 Canadian Library Association
 Canadian Magazine Publishing Association
 League of Canadian Poets
 Literary Presses Group
 Ontario Literacy Coalition
 Professional Writers Association of Canada
 Playwright’s Union of Canada
 Writer’s Union of Canada

Locations

Ontario 
The Word on the Street was first held in Toronto in 1990. Until 2003, the festival was on a section of Queen Street West in downtown Toronto. In 2004, the festival moved to Queen's Park, where it was held until moving to Harbourfront Centre in 2015.

The Word On The Street Kitchener event was first held in 2002 and takes place in the city's Victoria Park.

Nova Scotia 
The Word On The Street Halifax event, first held in 1995, takes place at the Cunard Event Centre on the Halifax waterfront.

British Columbia 
The Word On The Street Vancouver event, also first held in 1995, took place at Library Square. 2012 was the final year of this city's participation as a Word On The Street festival. It has been re-branded as WORD Vancouver.

Alberta 
In 2007, the board of the Calgary event announced that it would not be held in 2008 for logistical reasons.

The Word On The Street Lethbridge began in 2011 and happens in the street surrounding the Lethbridge Public Library.

Saskatchewan 
The first full-fledged Word On The Street Saskatoon was held in 2011 in and around the Frances Morrison Library.

External links
 Official site

Festivals in Vancouver
Festivals in Toronto
Festivals in Halifax, Nova Scotia
Festivals in the Regional Municipality of Waterloo
Culture of Kitchener, Ontario
Festivals in Lethbridge
Festivals in Saskatoon
Literary festivals in Alberta
Literary festivals in Ontario
Arts festivals in Nova Scotia
Arts festivals in Saskatchewan